Venkatraopalle is a municipal village in Boinpalle mandal of Karimnagar district in the state of Telangana, India. It lies exactly 18 km away from Karimnagar, located on the highway from Karimnagar to Vemulawada.

Villages in Karimnagar district